Compass Inn is a historic inn and tavern located in Laughlintown, Ligonier Township, Westmoreland County, Pennsylvania. It is a 2 1/2-storey, five bay log and stone building in a vernacular Georgian style.  The original section was built in 1799, and it is three bays wide.  The two bay stone section was added in the 1820s.  A clapboarded frame section was added in 1862.  It was restored in 1970, and operated as a local history museum. The property includes a rebuilt barn and blacksmith shop.

It was added to the National Register of Historic Places on February 24, 1995.

See also
 Contributing property
 Cultural landscape
 Historic preservation
 Keeper of the Register
 List of heritage registers
 Property type (National Register of Historic Places)
 United States National Register of Historic Places listings
 State Historic Preservation Office

References

External links
Compass Inn Museum website

Commercial buildings completed in 1799
Hotel buildings completed in 1862
Commercial buildings completed in 1862
History museums in Pennsylvania
Hotel buildings on the National Register of Historic Places in Pennsylvania
Georgian architecture in Pennsylvania
Buildings and structures in Westmoreland County, Pennsylvania
Museums in Westmoreland County, Pennsylvania
1799 establishments in Pennsylvania
National Register of Historic Places in Westmoreland County, Pennsylvania
Blacksmith shops